Project Infinity is the second full-length studio album by Man or Astro-man?. The cover is a reworking of Attilio Mineo's Man in Space with Sounds, which was used as the soundtrack to the futuristic "Bubbleator" exhibit at the 1962 Century 21 Exposition (Seattle World's Fair).

Track listing
"Escape Velocity" – 2:22
"Sferic Waves" – 2:47
"---------- (Classified)" – 1:57
"Transmissions From Venus" – 2:25
"Max Q" – 3:11
"Inside The Atom" – 2:10
"Philip K. Dick In The Pet Section Of A Wal-Mart" – 1:56
"Put Your Finger In The Socket" – 2:51
"Complex 34" – 2:17
"The Man From U.N.C.L.E." – 1:34
"Tomorrow Plus X" – 3:51
"Manta Ray" (originally by the Pixies) – 2:18
"Point Blank" – 2:58
"Special Agent Conrad Uno" – 3:05
"Alpha Surfari" – 2:07
"Mach One" (Vinyl-only bonus track) - 2:16

References
 
 

Man or Astro-man? albums
1995 albums
Albums produced by Steve Albini